was a Japanese politician who became the governor of Fukuoka Prefecture in 2011. In 2015, he was re-elected for a second term, and for a third term in 2019. In 2021 he resigned to receive cancer treatment and the vice governor Seitaro Hattori was elected to replace him.

References 

1949 births
2021 deaths
Politicians from Fukuoka Prefecture
Kyoto University alumni
Governors of Fukuoka Prefecture
Deaths from lung cancer in Japan